Little Jacques may refer to:
 Little Jacques (1923 film), a 1923 French silent drama film
 Little Jacques (1934 film), a 1934 French drama film
 Little Jacques (1953 film), a 1953 French drama film